, also known as Hello Kitty Land, is an indoor theme park located in Tama New Town, Tokyo, Japan. Opened on December 7, 1990, it hosts attractions, live shows, shopping outlets, and restaurants dedicated to Sanrio characters such as Hello Kitty, My Melody, Cinnamoroll, Gudetama, and Aggretsuko, in a manner akin to Disney theme parks.

Sanrio Puroland attracts over 1.5 million visitors per year, and is ranked among the major theme parks in Japan, along with both Tokyo Disney Resort parks and Fuji-Q Highland. Sanrio also operates Harmonyland, an outdoor theme park in Oita Prefecture.

History

Origins
During its conceptual phase, Sanrio Puroland was known by many names - first as Sanrio Communication World, as well as Sanrio Heart Park and Sanrio Piero Land. The original theme was going to be "communication", as opposed to Sanrio's existing works, including its characters. Sanrio Puroland was a "bald attempt" to challenge the Walt Disney company and its theme parks. To build the theme park, Shintaro Tsuji (then the president of Sanrio) worked with Landmark Entertainment Group and established a subsidiary called Sanrio Communication World Co., Ltd. (now merged into its current incarnation, Sanrio Entertainment Co. Ltd.). The initial design phase began in 1987, and Sanrio Puroland broke ground in November 16, 1988. It took a team of 2,500 workers approximately two years to complete, at a cost of around JPY 60-70 million.

Early days
Sanrio Puroland opened on December 7, 1990, and would operate at a loss for the first few years of operation, due to factors such as the aftereffects of the Japanese asset price bubble burst and complaints from city locals.

Modern times

Notable temporary closures
Sanrio Puroland was temporarily closed from February 22 to July 20, 2020, during the early stages of the COVID-19 pandemic.

Points of interest

Attractions

Rides
Sanrio Puroland offers visitors two dark rides. The Sanrio Characters Boat Ride, which tells the story of various Sanrio characters preparing for a party held by Hello Kitty, was the park's only ride until the opening of SANRIOTOWN in 2013, and with it the introduction of Mymeroad Drive, where riders are taken to a tour of Mariland (My Melody's homeland) via a rental car designed by Kuromi, My Melody's rival. Both rides offer commemorative photographs which can be separately purchased.

Walkthrough attractions
Sanrio Puroland has two walkthrough attractions, both found at SANRIOTOWN (second floor), as follows:
 Lady Kitty House - Visitors explore a regal-like residence with several items decorated in Hello Kitty's image (some parts of this attraction are designed by Japanese graphic designer and art director Yuni Yoshida). At the end of the attraction, visitors can have a photo together with Hello Kitty (can be printed for a separate fee).
 Kiki & Lala Twinklingtour - Visitors explore a replica of the birthplace of Kiki and Lala (Little Twin Stars).

Other attractions
Visitors can ring Hello Kitty's Bell of Happiness, located inside the Tree of Wisdom.

Other attractions inside Sanrio Puroland include five food factory displays (candy, juice, chocolate, bread, and ice cream), and a game corner with kids' rides, purikura booths, and UFO catchers.

Live entertainment

Main parades
The main parades of Sanrio Puroland take place around the Tree of Wisdom in Puro Village (first floor). The current main parade is "Miracle Gift Parade" (performances are currently suspended since 2020), which debuted in late 2015 to commemorate Sanrio Puroland's 25th anniversary. Past parades and seasonal parades are as follows:

Past parades
 Sanrio Starlight Parade (1990 to 1997)
 Sanrio All-Star Parade "Cosmic Fantasy" (July 19, 1997 to June 19, 2001)
 Illuminant (June 22, 2001 to June 12, 2007)
 Sanrio Heartful Parade "Believe with Hello Kitty" (June 15, 2007 to October 31, 2013)
 Hello Kitty 40th Anniversary Parade "ARIGATO EVERYONE!" (November 1, 2013 to January 13, 2015)
 My Melody and Little Twin Stars 40th Anniversary Parade "OMOIYARI TO YOU" (January 16, 2015 to November 29, 2015)

Seasonal parades
 Musical Show "The Puro Christmas" (Since 2018)
 Puro Summer Fest LIVE!!!! (Since 2019)

Stage shows
Sanrio Puroland hosts a variety of stage shows (both regular and seasional) in various areas. Selected past and present shows are as follows:

Märchen Theater
 KAWAII KABUKI (Since March 10, 2018) - A kawaii-themed kabuki musical adaptation of the Japanese traditional folktale Momotaro. Created in collaboration with Shochiku.
 Hello Kitty in Wonderland (April 20, 2013 to January 31, 2018) - A musical adaptation of Alice in Wonderland created to commemorate Hello Kitty's 40th anniversary. Includes a musical revue portion at the end of the show produced by Takarazuka.
 Hello Kitty and the Wizard of Oz (April 13, 2009 to April 4, 2013) - A musical adaptation of The Wizard of Oz created by Koike Shuichiro to commemorate Hello Kitty's 35th anniversary. Includes a musical revue portion at the end of the show produced by Takarazuka.
 Hello Kitty's Nutcracker (June 6, 2006 to April 5, 2009) - Based on The Nutcracker. Includes a musical revue portion at the end of the show produced by Takarazuka.
 Hello Kitty's Journey Through Fairyland (April 23, 2004 to May 31, 2006)
 Hello Kitty Dream Revue 2 (March 26, 2002 to April 4, 2004)
 Hello Kitty Dream Revue 1 (March 10, 2000 to March 17, 2002)
 Sanrio Characters on Broadway!! (April 10, 1991 to January 30, 1992)

Fairyland Theater
 MEMORY BOYS: The Shop Selling Memories (Since June 30, 2018)
 Little Hero (June 27, 2015 to May 26, 2018)
 My Melody and the Legend of Star and Flower (June 25, 2011 to May 24, 2015)
 Someday saga (June 20, 2003 to May 8, 2011)
 Marron Cream's Love Fantasia (February 1999 to May 18, 2003)
 Monkichi's Magical Mystery (July 1996 to February 1999)
 Pocchaco and Pekkle's Adventure (February 1992 to July 1996)

Discovery Theater
 Gudetama the Movie Show (Since June 25, 2016)

Other shows
Sanrio Puroland also hosts a daily fireworks show (during the summer) and various illumination shows.

Incidents
In 2015, a 5-year-old boy of foreign nationality fractured one of his fingers in the Sanrio Characters Boat Ride after reaching one of his hands out into the waterway and jamming it into one of the boats' metal stopper.

References

Footnotes

Citations

Bibliography

External links

 Official website

1990 establishments in Japan
Indoor amusement parks
Tourist attractions in Tokyo
Amusement parks in Japan
Buildings and structures in Tokyo
Sanrio
Tama, Tokyo
Amusement parks opened in 1990